Khalilabad (also Romanized as Khalīlābād; also known as Khalil Abad Japlogh) is a village in Chahar Cheshmeh Rural District, Kamareh District, Khomeyn County, Markazi Province, Iran. At the 2006 census, its population was 534, in 150 families.

References 

Populated places in Khomeyn County